Peter Ružička (9 August 1947 – 5 October 2003) was a Slovak computer scientist and mathematician who worked in the fields of distributed computing and computer networks. He was a professor at the Comenius University, Faculty of Mathematics, Physics and Informatics working in several research areas of theoretical computer science throughout his long career.

Biography
Ruzicka graduated from Comenius University in Bratislava in 1970. In 1982 he received his Ph.D. degree in Mathematical and Computer Science from Czechoslovak Academy of Sciences in Prague. He was awarded his Doctorate (Dr. rer. nat.) in Mathematical Informatics and Theoretical Cybernetics from Comenius University in Bratislava in 1994.

His earlier works cover topics that include formal languages, unification, graph pebbling and others. Most of his research works since the early 1990s were in the areas of Communication Networks and Distributed Computing. These works include studies of complexity issues for various problems and models of Interval Routing, and for various problems and topics in distributed computing (like oriented and unoriented networks) and in interconnection networks.

Ruzicka was a regular participant in many conferences in this area, including DISC and SIROCCO; he was on the program committees of DISC 1998  and 2000  and SIROCCO 1999. He also enthusiastically organised DISC 1999  in Bratislava – held for the first time in a former East-European country, which proved to be a great success, highly appreciated by the Steering Committee and the whole audience. He participated and was very actively involved in other conferences, including ICALP, SOFSEM and MFCS. These activities included co-chairing MFCS 1994, chairing MFCS 1997  and chairing SOFSEM 2001, and being on the program committees of MFCS 2000 and SOFSEM 1997.

In 2003, he was appointed a Professor in Informatics at the Comenius University in Bratislava.

Throughout his career, Ruzicka was a visiting professor at Northeastern University, Humboldt University of Berlin, Carleton University, University of Paderborn, RWTH Aachen University, Utrecht University, Technion University and many others.

Awards and recognition
Committee for Academic and Scientific Literature and Computer Programmes of the Slovak Literary Fund granted to Peter Ruzicka in memoriam and collective, Award of acknowledgement for Academic and Scientific Literature for 2005 in the category of Natural and Technical Sciences for the book Dissemination of Information in Communication Networks.

Personal life
Peter died of pancreatic cancer on 5 October 2003.

Publications
Peter Ruzicka has authored and co-authored numerous publications and books. One of his last projects he worked on had been an EATCS Series book on Dissemination of Information in Communication Networks

Other publications

References

External links
 
 
 Eulogy for Peter Ruzicka (in Slovak) Comenius University, Faculty of Mathematics, Physics and Informatics
 

1947 births
2003 deaths
Slovak computer scientists
Theoretical computer scientists
Scientists from Bratislava
Comenius University alumni
Researchers in distributed computing
Computer science educators
Computer science writers